Giuliano Vangi (born March 13, 1931) is an Italian sculptor. He received the Praemium Imperiale in the sculpture category in 2002.

Vangi was born in Barberino di Mugello and studied in the Istituto d'Arte and Accademia di Belle Arti at Florence. In 1959 he moved to Brazil, where he produced abstract works using materials such as crystal, iron and steel. In 1962, he returned to Italy, first in Varese and then in Pesaro. Later, he became a member of the Accademia delle Arti del Disegno in Florence, the Accademia di San Luca in Rome, and exhibited his work in numerous places in Italy.

His works include the statue of St. John the Baptist in Florence, "La Lupa" in Siena, a crucifix and new presbytery for the Padua Cathedral, a new altar for the Pisa Cathedral and the entrance sculpture for the Vatican Museum.

External links
 The Vangi Sculpture Garden Museum official site
 Praemium Imperiale Prize for Sculpture - 2002, Japan Art Association, Tokyo

1931 births
Living people
People from Barberino di Mugello
20th-century Italian sculptors
20th-century Italian male artists
Italian male sculptors
Italian contemporary artists